Tomas Skoloudik (born 24 October 1985, in Czech Republic), is a Czech model and, as a pornographic film actor, better known by his stage name Tommy Wood.

Career 
Skoloudik started modeling when he was 19 years old. From 2008 onwards, he went on to become a sought-after model for print modeling. He appeared on magazine covers like Men's Health, Men's Folio, Style: Men, and Indigo. This is in addition to extensive appearances in print and television advertising in Asia in Tokyo, Hong Kong, Singapore, and Kuala Lumpur. His high fashion modeling print work includes ad campaigns for Armani Jeans and Emporio Armani, Buffalo, Gas Jeans, Calvin Klein, Guess Underwear, Free Soul, Kenneth Cole, and Dolce&Gabbana.

In 2019, he transitioned to the adult film industry as a pornographic actor under the alias "Tommy Wood". He's represented by 101 Modeling.

Prior to his modelling career, Skoloudik had actually appeared in at least one adult film before.

References

External links 
 DNA Models

Czech male models
1985 births
Models from Prague
Living people
People from Dobřany